Nick Bell may refer to:

 Nick Bell (Australian entrepreneur), (born 1980), founder of WME, Australian digital agency 
 Nick Bell (businessman) (born 1983), British entrepreneur
 Nick Bell (American football) (born 1968), former American football running back
 Nick Bell (fencer) (born 1950), British fencer

See also
 Nicholas Bell (born 1958), English actor working in Australia